Trikala may refer to one of the following places in Greece:

Trikala, capital of the Trikala regional unit
Trikala, Corinthia, a village in western Corinthia, in the municipal unit of Xylokastro
Trikala, Imathia, a village in the eastern part of Imathia